The SZD-11 Albatros was a single-seat glider aircraft that was designed and built in Poland at Szybowcowy Zakład Doświadczalny - Glider Experimental Works in Bielsko-Biała in 1954. Only one prototype was completed and flown.

Development
Based on a fuselage of the SZD-8 Jaskółka, the SZD-11 Albatros was designed to investigate the performance of aircraft during flight in thermal lift. The main designer was Justyn Sandauer, and the main constructor was J. Niespał. With wings of greater span, and reduced empty weight, the wing loading was reduced, markedly improving the climb performance over the 16m-span SZD-8 Jaskółka. Three more SZD-11 aircraft were planned with fixed trailing edges and no flaps, but only the prototype was completed. The SZD-11 first flew on 14 September 1954, flown by Tadeusz Góra.

Specifications (SZD-11 Albatros)

See also

References

Coates, Andrew. “Jane's World Sailplanes & Motor Gliders new edition”. London, Jane's. 1980. 
Taylor, J. H. (ed) (1989) Jane's Encyclopedia of Aviation. Studio Editions: London. p. 29

External links

https://web.archive.org/web/20070608195616/http://www.sailplanedirectory.com/PlaneDetails.cfm?planeID=459
http://www.piotrp.de/SZYBOWCE/dszd11.htm

1950s Polish sailplanes
SZD11
SZD aircraft
Aircraft first flown in 1954